Anisoptera laevis is a tree in the family Dipterocarpaceae. The specific epithet laevis means "smooth", referring to the leaves.

Description
The bark is fissured and flaky.

Distribution and habitat
Anisoptera laevis is native to Thailand, Peninsular Malaysia, Singapore, Sumatra and Borneo.

Conservation
Anisoptera laevis has been assessed as vulnerable on the IUCN Red List. It is threatened by land conversion for agriculture and by logging for its timber (now illegal). The species is found in protected areas throughout its distribution.

References

laevis
Flora of Borneo
Flora of Malaya
Flora of Sumatra
Flora of Thailand
Plants described in 1922
Taxonomy articles created by Polbot
Taxa named by Henry Nicholas Ridley